The Marine Appeal Tribunal of New South Wales, is a former tribunal in New South Wales, a state of Australia, which dealt with appeals from decisions of the NSW Minister for Ports under certain decisions under the Marine Safety Act 1998 (NSW). The tribunal is now constituted under the New South Wales Civil and Administrative Tribunal.

Constitution
The tribunal was constituted under the Marine Safety Act 1998 (NSW).  It sat as a three-member panel. The former chairperson of the tribunal was a magistrate of the Local Court of New South Wales appointed by the Attorney General of New South Wales.  The other two panel members consisted of persons nominated by the Minister for Ports and by a person nominated by the appellant.

The tribunal was unusual in that the parties to the dispute could nominate the persons who sat on the tribunal. The usual situation in the state was that the Governor of New South Wales could appoint the members independently based on their knowledge and expertise.

Procedure
Each member of the panel was required to take an oath that he or she will perform the duties of a member faithfully and fearlessly. The appeal was then run in the manner determined by the chairperson.  The tribunal was not bound by the rules of evidence and could obtain information in any way it thinks fit within reason. In reaching a decision on the appeal, the tribunal applied such standards with respect to the objection as it considers to be reasonable in the circumstances.

The chairperson may dismiss the appeal immediately if he or she determines that the appellant is not adversely affected by the minister's decision. Otherwise, the decision of the tribunal is by way of majority.

There was no office for the tribunal as it was only called into existence when a dispute arises.

See also

List of New South Wales courts and tribunals
Court of Marine Inquiry

References

External links

Former New South Wales courts and tribunals
Admiralty courts
1998 establishments in Australia
Courts and tribunals established in 1998
2013 disestablishments in Australia
Courts and tribunals disestablished in 2013